Ernst Grissemann (18 February 1934 – 6 January 2023) was an Austrian radio host, journalist, and actor.

Biography
The following year, the station was absorbed by ORF.

From 1979 to 1990, he served as director of ORF and co-founded Ö1. From 1990 to 1994, he was director of Radio Tirol before once again directing ORF in November 1994.

Grissemann was ORF's commentator for the Eurovision Song Contest from 1970 to 1998 and for the Vienna New Year's Concert from 1983 to 2007. In 1995, he became a freelance journalist for German-speaking radio and television, such as Tiroler Tageszeitung. From 1997 to 1998, he hosted the Sonntag bei Grissemann on Radio Wien.

He was the father of comedian Christoph Grissemann and film critic . Grissemann died in Vienna on 6 January 2023 at the age of 88.

References

1934 births
2023 deaths
Austrian radio presenters
Austrian television presenters
ORF (broadcaster) people
Austrian stage actors
People from Imst District